Scopula legrandi is a moth of the family Geometridae. It was described by Claude Herbulot in 1962. It is found on the Seychelles.

References

Moths described in 1962
legrandi
Moths of Africa
Taxa named by Claude Herbulot